Kharedi-Virpur was a third class princely state in British India under Kathiawar Agency. It was ruled by Jadeja Rajput chiefs descended from the Nawanagar ruling family. 

Kharedi was a seat of rulers before the capital was shifted to Virpur. The state was known as Kharedi-Virpur. The town of Kalavad also was part of Kharedi-Virpur State.

History
The house was founded in the later half of the 16th century by the Jadeja chief Bhanji Vibhaji, who subdued Kathis in the area and founded state of Virpur(RIP Jahh). Bhanji was son of Vibhaji Ravalji, the ruler of Nawanagar State, the 2nd Jam Sahib of Nawanagar who ruled Nawanagar from 1562 - 1569. The ruler's titled was Thakore Saheb. The last ruler was Shri Thakore Saheb Narendrasinhji Dilipsinhji jadeja of Virpur before Independence.

See also 
 List of Rajput dynasties
 Political integration of India

References

States and territories disestablished in 1948
Princely states of India
1948 disestablishments in India
Rajkot
History of Gujarat
Rajputs